Ievgen Poltavskyi is a Paralympic swimmer from Ukraine competing mainly in category S8 events.

Ievgen was part of the Ukrainian team that travelled to the 2008 Summer Paralympics in Beijing.  He finished last in his heat in the 100m freestyle, finished sixth in the 100m backstroke and won a bronze medal as part of the Ukrainian quartet in the  medley.

References

External links
 

Paralympic swimmers of Ukraine
Swimmers at the 2008 Summer Paralympics
Paralympic bronze medalists for Ukraine
Ukrainian male freestyle swimmers
Living people
Swimmers at the 2012 Summer Paralympics
Medalists at the 2008 Summer Paralympics
Year of birth missing (living people)
Medalists at the World Para Swimming European Championships
Paralympic medalists in swimming
S8-classified Paralympic swimmers
21st-century Ukrainian people